The Burgfeldstand (elevation 2063 metres) is a mountain of the Emmental Alps, located in the Bernese Oberland near Beatenberg. It is the highest summit of the Güggisgrat. Several trails lead to the top.

References

External links
 Burgfeldstand on Hikr

Two-thousanders of Switzerland
Mountains of the Alps
Bernese Oberland
Mountains of the canton of Bern
Emmental Alps
Mountains of Switzerland